The following is a list of women classical flautists by nationality – notable women who are well known for their work in the field of classical music.

Australia
Jane Rutter (born 1958), classical and jazz flautist, chamber musician
Linda Vogt (1922–2013), classical and jazz flautist, educator

Chile
Viviana Guzmán (born 1964), prominent soloist, composer and recording artist

Denmark
Ulla Miilmann (born 1972), principal flautist of the Danish National Symphony Orchestra
Michala Petri (born 1958), recorder virtuoso, broadcaster and recording artist

France
Patricia Lavail (born 1962), recorder player and educator
Sarah Louvion (born 1976), award-winning classical flautist, soloist and chamber musician

Germany
Dorothee Oberlinger (born 1969), recorder player, soloist, chamber musician, recording artist and educator
Dorothea Winter (1949–2012), recorder player, chamber musician and educator

Hungary
Noémi Győri (born 1983), soloist, chamber musician, recording artist and educator

India
Rasika Shekar (born 1989), Indo-American flautist who plays the classical Indian bansuri

Israel
Drora Bruck (born 1966), recorder player, soloist, chamber musician and educator
Tamar Lalo (born 1984), recorder player specializing in early music, now based in the Netherlands
Sharon Bezaly (born 1972), flute player, soloist, now based in Sweden

Japan
Ayako Takagi (born 1977), soloist, recitalist, recording artist and academic

Mexico
Elena Duran (born 1949), Mexican-American flautist, concerto appearances and recordings with major orchestras

Netherlands
Eleonore Pameijer (born 1960), soloist, recitalist and artistic director
Kathinka Pasveer (born 1959), classical flautist and educator
Abbie de Quant (born 1946), soloist, recording artist and educator
Marion Verbruggen (born 1950), leading recorder soloist, chamber musician and conductor

Norway
Ingrid Søfteland Neset (born 1992), award-winning classical flautist
Gro Sandvik (born 1942), soloist and chamber music performer

Poland
Jadwiga Kotnowska (born 1957), soloist, recitalist, recording artist and chamber musician

Serbia
Sanja Stijačić (born 1965), soloist, chamber musician and academic

Slovenia
Irena Grafenauer (born 1957), soloist, chamber musician and educator

Switzerland
Caroline Charrière (1960–2018), composer, conductor, flautist, chamber musician and educator

Turkey
Şefika Kutluer (born 1961), award-winning soloist and Baroque specialist

United Kingdom
Rachel Begley (fl. 1990s), recorder and Baroque bassoon virtuosi now based in New York
Lisa Beznosiuk (born 1956), flautist specializing in Baroque and historical works
Laura Cannell (fl. 2000s), composer, recorder player, violinist and broadcaster
Lorna McGhee (born 1972), Scottish flutist and educator, chamber musician
Susan Milan (born 1947), classical performer, composer and academic
Hilary du Pré (born 1942), flautist and memoirist

United States
Jeanne Baxtresser (born 1947), recitalist, concerto soloist, chamber musician, educator and recording artist
Frances Blaisdell (1912–2009), early American professional flautist and educator
Vicki Boeckman (born 1955), recorder player, performer and educator
Claire Chase (born 1978), recitalist, recording artist and arts entrepreneur
Valerie Coleman (fl. 1997), flautist and composer contributing to chamber music
Elena Duran (born 1949), Mexican-American flautist, concerto appearances and recordings with major orchestras
Sherry Finzer (born 1963), classical soloist who also plays other styles
Cynthia Folio (born 1954), composer, flutist, music theorist and academic
Jeanne Galway (born 1955), American-born flautist and educator now based in Switzerland
Marianne Gedigian (fl. 1990s), recitalist, principal flute of major orchestras
Katherine Hoover (1937–2018), composer, flutist, music theorist and educator
Catherine Ransom Karoly (fl. 1990s), principal flute and soloist, chamber musician
Anne La Berge (born 1955), flutist and composer now based in Amsterdam
Anne McGinty (born 1945), flutist, composer and music publisher
Marina Piccinini (born 1968), Italian-American virtuoso flautist specializing in Mozart and Bach
Amy Porter (fl. 1990s), soloist, chamber musician and educator
Gwyn Roberts (fl. 1990s), recorder and traverso soloist, chamber musician and educator
Paula Robison (born 1941), soloist and music educator
Mindy Rosenfeld (fl. 1980s), flautist, piper and harpist
Elaine Shaffer (1925–1973), principal flautist, soloist and chamber musician
Mimi Stillman (fl. 2000s), concert flutist, chamber musician and educator
Carol Wincenc (born 1949), soloist, chamber musician and academic
Eugenia Zukerman (born 1944), flute virtuoso, writer and journalist

See also
Lists of women in music
Women in classical music

Lists of musicians by instrument
Classical flautists
Women flautists
Lists of women in music